Singen (Low Alemannic: Singe) is an industrial city in the very south of Baden-Württemberg in southern Germany and just north of the German-Swiss border.

Location
Singen is an industrial city situated in the very south of Baden-Württemberg in Germany close to Lake Constance just north of the German-Swiss border and is the most important city in the Hegau area.

Landmarks

The most famous landmark of Singen is Hohentwiel, a volcanic stub on which there are the ruins of a fortress destroyed by French troops during the Napoleonic Wars.

World War II 'Singen route'
Singen is notable in military history for the Singen route in World War II. This route into Switzerland was discovered by Dutch naval lieutenant Hans Larive in late 1940 on his first escape attempt from an Oflag (prisoner's camp for officers) in Soest. After being captured at the Swiss border near Singen, the interrogating Gestapo officer was so confident the war would soon be won by Germany that he told Larive the safe way across the border. The officer described how someone could walk to the 'Ramsen salient' where the Swiss border juts into German territory. Larive did not forget and many prisoners later escaped using this route - that included Larive himself, Francis Steinmetz, Anthony Luteyn, Airey Neave, Pat Reid and Howard Wardle in their escapes from Colditz Castle when Colditz was used in the war as Oflag IV-C.

Transport
Singen is an important regional train hub with three railway lines and the terminal of the Gäu Railway with connections to Stuttgart and the Swiss Schaffhausen.

Twin towns – sister cities

Singen is twinned with:
 La Ciotat, France (1968)
 Pomezia, Italy (1974)
 Celje, Slovenia (1989)
 Kobeliaky, Ukraine (1993)

Notable people
Herbert Haag (1915–2001), Swiss Catholic theologian
Knut Folkerts (born 1952), former terrorist Red Army Faction (RAF)
Beatrix Ruf (born 1960), director and curator of the Kunsthalle Zürich
Jens Truckenbrod (born 1980), footballer
Cédric Soares (born 1991), Portuguese footballer

References

External links

Konstanz (district)
Hegau
Baden